Galgano or Galganus may refer to:

Galgano Guidotti (1148 – 1181), or Saint Galgano, Catholic saint from Tuscany 
Galgano, an alternate name for Gawain

See also
Galbanus
Galvanus (disambiguation)